Pa Mei is a village in Tung Chung on Lantau Island, Hong Kong.

Administration
Shan Ha (Pa Mei) is a recognized village under the New Territories Small House Policy.

History
At the time of the 1911 census, the population of Pa Mei was 46. The number of males was 27.

References

External links
 Delineation of area of existing village Pa Mei (Tung Chung) for election of resident representative (2019 to 2022)

Villages in Islands District, Hong Kong
Tung Chung